Antal Amade de Várkony was a Hungarian count and notable comes of Zagreb, Croatia, who established the first public theatre in the city of Zagreb in 1797. His father was Count Tádé Amade, (1724-1807), and his mother was the countess Mária Angélika Nyáry von Bedegh (1734-?).

The theatre was called Amadeo's theatre and was open until 1834. Amadeo’s theatre was situated in the former Blatna (Mud) and Kazalisna (Theatre) Street, which afterwards got the name Demetrova. After closing his theatre, Amade withdrew to his estate in Hungary. The building in which it was situated is now the Croatian Natural History Museum and, from 2000, the home of the Amadeo Theatre and Music Company.

References

External links 
 History of the Croatian National Theatre
 Croatian Natural History Museum
 Amadeo Theatre and Music Company 

1760 births
1835 deaths
Theatres in Croatia
Culture in Zagreb
Hungarian nobility
18th-century Hungarian male writers
Masters of the doorkeepers